Qardaha ( / ALA-LC: Qardāḥah) is a town in northwestern Syria, in the mountains overlooking the coastal town of Latakia. Nearby localities include Kilmakho to the west, Bustan al-Basha to the southwest, Harf al-Musaytirah to the southeast and Muzayraa to the north. According to the Syrian Central Bureau of Statistics, Qardaha had a population of 8,671 in 2004. It has a predominantly Alawite population and is the traditional home of the al-Assad family, which has ruled Syria since the 1970 Corrective Movement.

Syrian President Hafez al-Assad, who ruled from 1970 to 2000, was born in Qardaha. Under Assad, the government poured massive investments into Qardaha, Latakia and the surrounding region. Qardaha has many luxurious villas. A major statue of Hafez al-Assad is found in the town center, and a huge mausoleum containing the graves of Bassel al-Assad and Hafez al-Assad is also located there. Hasan al-Khayer was also born in Qardaha.

Climate and geography
Qardaha has a hot-summer Mediterranean climate (Köppen climate classification: Csa). Qardaha is in a mountainous area, but its altitude is only between 350 and 500 meters. It is in a beautiful forested area. Qardaha has much rainfall. The average high temperature in July is 29 °C, and in January is 7 °C. There is nearly 828 mm of rainfall annually and three days of snow in January. The climate and nature in Qerdaha favour agriculture, and there are apple and orange plantations and tobacco farms.
Source #3 Climate Zone (Rainy and snowy days)

History
The Aramaic meaning of Qardaha is the first village. The name of Qardaha is Phoenician and means "the place that manufactures, and sharpens the weapons". Several of the villages and places situated in the Coastal Mountain Range have names that were originally Phoenician.

It is said among the Circassian people of Syria that the town of Qardaha was actually founded by Circassians during the time of the Mamluk sultan Qansuh al-Ghawri. Evidence for this can be seen by the large number of Circassians that live in the town and the entire Alawite Mountain region. There is even a street named Cherkess Street as well as a large family of the same name. Qardaha in the Circassian language means "Welcome".

The residents of Qardaha descended from the Kalbiyya tribal confederation and the town served as the confederation's principle center. During the late Ottoman era, between 1840 and 1880, tensions between the authorities and the Alawite tribes of the coastal mountains increased sharply. In 1854 the Ottoman governor of the Latakia Sanjak ("Latakia District") was killed in armed confrontation between the authorities and members of the Qardaha-based tribe. This emboldened the Kalbiyya fighters, who proceeded to launch more raids against Ottoman positions, which the authorities responded to harshly.

Fear of attracting the attention and subjugation of the authorities, and to avoid taxation and military conscription, was one of the reasons many of the Alawite fellahin ("peasants") who lived in the vicinity of Qardaha, opted not to establish an agglomeration of settlement. Until the present day, Qardaha is surrounded by scattered rural hamlets. The town formerly had a significant Christian population until the mid to late 20th-century, when most Christian families left for the major coastal cities.

In 1970 Qardaha was given city status, along with al-Shaykh Badr and Duraykish. Together they made up around 6% of the total urban population of the two coastal governorates, Latakia and Tartus. The three towns were also designated the seats of newly formed districts (mantiqah) centered around them. According to French anthropologist Fabrice Balanche, the Ba'athist government which gained power in the 1960s, displayed a degree of favoritism for the three towns, all of which were Alawite, and Qardaha specifically. She particularly pointed to the fact that the subdistricts (nahiya) of al-Qadmus and Mashta al-Helu, predominantly Ismaili and Christian, respectively, were slated to become districts when each of their populations passed the 60,000 threshold, although the subdistricts of Qardaha, al-Shaykh Badr and Duraykish all had less than 40,000 inhabitants.

In early October 2012 during the Syrian civil war, Mohammad Assad, cousin of President Bashar Assad and leader of the local Shabiha, was wounded after a gunfight in the town with member of the rival Alawite Khayyir clan. This was sparked by a discussion about the earlier detention at Damascus airport of Abdel-Aziz Khayyer, a Qardaha native and member of the latter clan. On 24 April 2013, the village was attacked with a barrage of rockets launched by rebels. In early August 2013 in a surprise offensive, rebel fighters advanced south to the outskirts of the village of Aramo, 20 km. (12 miles) from Qardaha. One of the attackers stated "The objective is to reach Qardaha and hurt them like they are hurting us."

References

Populated places in Qardaha District
Alawite communities in Syria